Microhyla picta is a species of frog in the family Microhylidae.
It is endemic to Vietnam.
Its natural habitats are swamps, freshwater marshes, and intermittent freshwater marshes.

References

picta
Taxonomy articles created by Polbot
Amphibians described in 1901